Scopula prisca is a moth of the  family Geometridae. It is found on Madagascar.

References

Moths described in 1956
prisca
Moths of Madagascar